Artin may refer to:

 Artin (name), a surname and given name, including a list of people with the name
 Artin, a variant of Harutyun, an Armenian given name
 15378 Artin, a main-belt asteroid

See also